Łasicki (feminine: Łasicka; plural: Łasiccy) is a Polish surname. Notable people with this surname include:

 Igor Łasicki (born 1995), Polish footballer
 Jan Łasicki (1534–1602), Polish historian and theologian
 Maciej Łasicki (born 1965), Polish rower

See also
 

Polish-language surnames